Cornelis Cussens (1580 – 24 May 1618) was a Dutch Golden Age draughtsman and glass painter.

Biography
Cussens was born and died in Haarlem.  According to Houbraken he was a contemporary of the brothers Crabeth and Willem Thibaut.

According to Karel van Mander who called him Cornelis Ysbrandsz, he was an excellent glass painter who owned some works by Hendrick Goltzius.

According to the RKD he was a draughtsman known for his figures.

References

1580 births
1618 deaths
Dutch Golden Age painters
Dutch male painters
Artists from Haarlem
Dutch draughtsmen
Dutch stained glass artists and manufacturers